Allan Lewis (born 31 May 1971) is a Welsh former professional footballer who played as a defender. He made 50 appearances in the Football League for Cardiff City.

Career
Lewis began his career with Cardiff City after joining the club on a YTS deal. In his first season in the first team, Cardiff suffered relegation to the Fourth Division. In the following two years, Lewis was a regular in the first team, reaching 50 league appearances before he was forced to retire due to injury.

References

1971 births
Living people
Welsh footballers
Cardiff City F.C. players
English Football League players
Association football defenders